

The Emigh A-2 Trojan was an American single-engined cabin cantilever monoplane designed and built by the Emigh Trojan Aircraft Company of Douglas, Arizona.

Design and development
The A-2 had side-by-side seating in an enclosed cabin for a pilot and passenger. Of all metal construction it had a fixed tricycle landing gear and was powered by a Continental A90 flat-four piston engine.  Many major components of the aircraft were designed to be interchangeable to simplify and lower manufacturing costs. The vertical and horizontal stabilizers where interchange able as well as the rudder and elevators.  A symmetrical section of the wing was interchangeable and the upper and lower fuselage skins were also identical.  A total of 58 Trojans had been completed when production ceased in 1950.

Specifications

References

Notes

Bibliography

1940s United States civil utility aircraft
Low-wing aircraft
Single-engined tractor aircraft
Aircraft first flown in 1946